David Roentgen (1743 in HerrnhaagFebruary 12, 1807), was a famous German cabinetmaker of the eighteenth century, famed throughout Europe for his marquetry and his secret drawers and poes and mechanical fittings. His work embraces the late Rococo and the Neoclassical styles.

Chronology
In 1753 his father Abraham Roentgen, who had trained in London in the workshop of William Gomm, migrated to the Moravian settlement at Neuwied, near Coblenz, where he established a furniture factory. David learned his trade in his father's workshop, inherited the paternal business in 1772, and entered into partnership with the clockmaker Kintzing. By that time, the name of the firm  was well known, even in France. Oddly he is remembered in France as one of the foreign cabinetmakers and workers in marquetry who, like Jean-François Oeben and Jean Henri Riesener, achieved distinction during the closing years of the Ancien Régime. Since Paris was the style center of Europe, he opened a show-room, but his furniture was made in Neuwied. The engraver Willerters recorded his appearance in Paris, initially on August 30, 1774, that 

Roentgen was first and foremost an astute man of business. His outlet did not prosper as expected. The powerful trade corporation of the maîtres ébénistes disputed his right to sell in Paris furniture of foreign manufacture. In 1780 he resolved this restriction by inventing new style of marquetry, which attracted a good deal of attention. Instead of representing light and shade by burning, smoking or engraving the pieces of veneer, DR arranged intricate patterns of wood inlay to create the impression of pietra dura. His great rivals admitted him to their exclusive guild.

He appears to have curried considerable favor with the queen, Marie Antoinette, whose first language was also German. On several of his journeys throughout Europe, she charged him to deliver her presents and dolls dressed in the latest Paris fashions. They were intended to serve as patterns for the dressmakers to her mother and her sisters.

Because of his proficiency in constructing furniture with amusing mechanical features, the queen appointed Roentgen ébéniste-mechanicien. Popular in the late eighteenth century, ladies' dressing tables were designed  to appear as a desk, drawing table or other less personal furniture, to conceal toiletries. A spring trigger, hidden catch or button revealed its dual purpose.

David mastered this style, dubbed Harlequin after the theatrical character, whatever the reference to archetype implied. His mechanical inventiveness outshone more accomplished cabinetry. The extent of his fame is shown by Goethe mention of him in Wilhelm Meister. The box inhabited by the fairy during her travels with her mortal lover is compared to Roentgen's desk in which a single pull released many springs, latches, hidden drawers, secret compartments and mechanical devices. Before he lost his head, Louis XVI paid him 80,000 livres for such a desk. Outwardly it looked like a commode. Marquetry panels showed Minerva, Roman goddess of arts, hanging the portrait of Marie Antoinette on a column engraved with her name. Above the riot of architectural details was a musical clock (the work of the partner Peter Kinzing), topped by a cupola representing Parnassus, party peak. It disappeared during the First Empire under Napoleon.

Roentgen did not confine his attentions to Paris, or even to France. He traveled about Europe accompanied by furniture vans of his factory's products. Undoubtedly his aptitude as a commercial traveler was remarkable. He had shops in Berlin and Saint Petersburg. On one of his visits to Russia, he sold to the Empress Catherine furniture invoiced at 20,000 roubles. She added 5000 roubles and a personal present, a gold snuff-box, for quick fulfillment of an unexpected request. When news arrived of the Russian navy's victory over the Turks at Cheshme, DR ingeniously mounted a clock commemorating the date and time onto the Czarina's personal secretaire desk. This suite of furniture is believed to be in the Palace of the Hermitage, with vaults of so much remarkable art uncatalogued outside Russia. To the protection of the queen of France and the empress of Russia, David added the king in Prussia, Frederick William II, who in 1792 made him a Commerzienrat, commercial agent for the Lower Rhine district. The French Revolution and the  Napoleonic Wars eclipsed Roentgen's star as many other great cabinetmakers of the period. In 1793 the Revolutionary government, declaring him an émigré, seized the contents of his showrooms, inventory and personal belongings. After that, he did no further business in Paris. Five years later, the French invasion of Germany, Prussia and Austria led to the closing of his factory in Neuwied. He died half ruined at Wiesbaden on 12 February 1807.

The most complete collection of his work in private hands remains that of the ducal house of Saxe-Coburg and Gotha, exhibited at Callenberg Castle in Coburg, north Bavaria. In 2012 Wolfam Koepp of the Metropolitan Museum of Art discovered a particular type of Roentgen table with removable legs for easier transport. Was this table the earliest form of flatpack? A team from the Victoria and Albert Museum investigated further and confirmed Koepp's process and conclusions in March 2014, shedding new light on the inventor of flat-pack / ready-to-assemble furniture. Until then, Gillis Lundgren held that title from 1951 for IKEA. Its blame has now been traced back 200 years before the pretender. David Roentgen not only mastered intrigue but flat-pack home assembly without an allen key.

Assessment
According to his biography in the Encyclopædia Britannica Eleventh Edition of 1911, Roentgen was not a great cabinetmaker: "His forms were often clumsy, ungraceful, and commonplace; his furniture lacked the artistry of the French and the English cabinetmakers of the great period which came to an end about 1790. His bronzes were poor in design and coarse in execution; his work, in short, is tainted by commercialism. As an inlayer, however, he holds a position of high distinction. His marquetry is bolder and more vigorous than that of Riesener, who in other respects soared far above him. As an adroit devisor of mechanism he fully earned a reputation which former generations rated more highly than the modern critic, with his facilities for comparison, is prepared to accept. On the mechanical side he produced, with the help of Kintzing, many long-cased and other clocks with ingenious indicating and registering apparatus. Roentgen delighted in architectural forms, and his marquetry more often than not represents those scenes from classical mythology which were the dear delight of the 18th century." He is well represented at the V&A Museum in London, and other collections.

See also
Louis XVI furniture
Louis XVI style

References

Manuel Mayer, 2018. Die Verwirklichung eines Möbels. Der Schreibsekretär von Abraham Roentgen in der Residenz zu Würzburg., in: Mainfränkisches Jahrbuch für Geschichte und Kunst, Bd. 70, Archiv des Historischen Vereins für Unterfranken und Aschaffenburg, Bd. 141, Würzburg 2018, p. 239-259. 
Hans Huth, 1974. Roentgen furniture: Abraham and David Roentgen, European cabinet-makers
Dietrich Fabian, 1992. Abraham und David Roentgen: Von der Schreinerwerkstatt zur Kunstmöbel-Manufaktur
Josef Maria Greber, 1980. Abraham und David Roentgen: Möbel für Europa : Werdegang, Kunst und Technik einer deutschen Kabinett-Manufaktur
Rosemarie Stratmann-Döhler, 1998. Mechanische Wunder, edles Holz: Roentgen-Möbel des 18. Jahrhunderts in Baden und Württemberg
Fabin, Dietrich. Kinzing und Roentgen Uhren aus Neuwied. 1984. 
Kreismuseum Neuwied: Kinzing & Co. Innovative Uhren aus der Provinz. 2003.

External links
 Koeppe, Wolfram. "Abraham and David Roentgen". In Heilbrunn Timeline of Art History. New York: The Metropolitan Museum of Art, 2000–. (June 2013) 
David Roentgen Papers collection from the Metropolitan Museum of Art Libraries
Extravagant Inventions: The Princely Furniture of the Roentgens, exhibition at the Metropolitan Museum of Art
 Explore | David Roentgen | Flat-Pack
 Flatpacked! | V&A

German furniture designers
German furniture makers
1743 births
1807 deaths